Fortunata is a 2017 Italian drama directed by Sergio Castellitto. It was screened in the Un Certain Regard section at the 2017 Cannes Film Festival. At Cannes, Jasmine Trinca won the Un Certain Regard Jury Award for Best Performance.

Cast
 Jasmine Trinca as Fortunata
 Hanna Schygulla as Lotte
 Stefano Accorsi as Patrizio
 Alessandro Borghi as Chicano
 Edoardo Pesce as Franco

References

External links
 

2017 films
2017 drama films
Films directed by Sergio Castellitto
Italian drama films
2010s Italian-language films
2010s Italian films